Dirichletia obovata, synonym Carphalea obovata, is a species of plant in the family Rubiaceae. It is endemic to Socotra.  Its natural habitat is subtropical or tropical dry forests.

References 

Endemic flora of Socotra
Knoxieae
Least concern plants
Taxonomy articles created by Polbot